Håvard Ottesen (born 30 March 1977) is a retired Norwegian football midfielder.

Hailing from Krokelvdalen, Ottesen went from local team Kroken to Tromsdalen UIL in 1992 and played first-team football from 1993. He also represented Norway as a youth international.

In late August 2001 he signed for Lillestrøm SK on loan for the rest of the 2001 season. He got two Eliteserien games and one cup game. Returning to Tromsdalen, he played throughout the 2004 season.

References

1977 births
Living people
Sportspeople from Tromsø
Norwegian footballers
Tromsdalen UIL players
Lillestrøm SK players
Norwegian First Division players
Eliteserien players
Association football midfielders
Norway youth international footballers